The Teeswater River is a river in the municipalities of Arran–Elderslie, Brockton and South Bruce in Bruce County in Southwestern Ontario, Canada. It is in the Great Lakes Basin and empties into the Saugeen River at Paisley, Ontario.

The community of Teeswater is located on the river.

The river was named after the River Tees in England.

References

Sources

See also
List of rivers of Ontario

Rivers of Bruce County